Jerónimo "Jero" Miñarro Navarro (born 19 September 1977) is a Spanish retired footballer who played as a central defender.

Club career
Born in Lorca, Region of Murcia, Jero began his senior career with Valencia CF's reserves at the age of 19, never appearing officially for the first team. Subsequently, he moved to Segunda División and joined Rayo Vallecano, only playing twice during the season as the Madrid club promoted to La Liga.

In July 1999, Jero joined Superleague Greece side Panachaiki FC, being first-choice during the campaign and scoring three goals as they narrowly avoided relegation. He returned to his country afterwards, appearing in only 19 second division games over the course of three seasons combined and being relegated with two of the three teams he represented in that level, Getafe CF and Burgos CF.

Jero's last appearance in the second tier would be in 2002–03 with UD Almería (no games played). Until his retirement in June 2010 at nearly 33, he played exclusively in the lower leagues, captaining Lorca Deportiva CF in his final year. Subsequently, he joined the technical staff of Segunda División B's AD Cerro de Reyes.

International career
Jero played for Spain at various youth levels. He participated with the under-20s at the 1997 FIFA World Youth Championship in Malaysia, featuring in one match for the eventual quarter-finalists.

References

External links

CiberChe biography and stats 

1977 births
Living people
Spanish footballers
Footballers from the Region of Murcia
Association football defenders
Segunda División players
Segunda División B players
Tercera División players
Valencia CF Mestalla footballers
Rayo Vallecano players
Getafe CF footballers
Burgos CF footballers
Zamora CF footballers
UD Almería players
Granada CF footballers
UD San Sebastián de los Reyes players
Lorca Deportiva CF footballers
Super League Greece players
Panachaiki F.C. players
Spain youth international footballers
Spanish expatriate footballers
Expatriate footballers in Greece